Anodocheilus is a genus of beetles in the family Dytiscidae, containing the following species:

 Anodocheilus bellitae Young, 1974
 Anodocheilus elenauerae Young, 1974
 Anodocheilus elizabethae Young, 1974
 Anodocheilus exiguus (Aubé, 1838)
 Anodocheilus florencae Young, 1974
 Anodocheilus francescae Young, 1974
 Anodocheilus germanus (Sharp, 1882)
 Anodocheilus guatemalensis (Zaitzev, 1910)
 Anodocheilus janae Young, 1974
 Anodocheilus lenorae Young, 1974
 Anodocheilus maculatus Babington, 1841
 Anodocheilus oramae Young, 1974
 Anodocheilus phyllisae Young, 1974
 Anodocheilus ruthae Young, 1974
 Anodocheilus sarae Young, 1974
 Anodocheilus silvestrii (Régimbart, 1903)
 Anodocheilus villae Young, 1974
 Anodocheilus virginiae Young, 1974

References

Dytiscidae